Limnocoris moapensis, the moapa warm springs naucorid, is a species of creeping water bug in the family Naucoridae.

References

Further reading

 

Articles created by Qbugbot
Insects described in 1950
Naucoridae